The Nelson Mandela Challenge is an annual soccer match between South Africa and an invited visiting team. The challenge was founded in 1994, as a way to raise money for the Nelson Mandela Children's Fund.

Format
The challenge is played as a single leg, held in South Africa on all but one occasion. In previous years the title was shared if the match was tied after 90 minutes. From 2002 the match will proceed to penalties if there is no winner after 90 minutes.

Match results

All-time record

References

Soccer competitions in South Africa
Challenge